An Associated Press (AP) investigation revealed in 2017 that more than 100 United Nations (UN) peacekeepers ran a child sex ring in Haiti over a 10-year period and none were ever jailed. The report further found that over the previous 12 years, there had been almost 2,000 allegations of sexual abuse and exploitation by peacekeepers and other UN personnel around the world. AP found the abuse to be much greater than originally thought. After the AP report, U.S. Ambassador to the UN, Nikki Haley, urged all countries to hold UN peacekeepers accountable for any sexual abuse and exploitation. As early as 2004, Amnesty International reported that underage girls were being kidnapped, tortured and forced into prostitution in Kosovo with UN and NATO personnel being the customers driving the demand for the sex slaves. The UN's department of peacekeeping in New York acknowledged at that time that "peacekeepers have come to be seen as part of the problem in trafficking rather than the solution".

Rapid increase in prostitution

Reporters witnessed a rapid increase in prostitution in Cambodia, Mozambique, Bosnia, and Kosovo after UN and, in the case of the latter two, NATO peacekeeping forces moved in. Instances of abuse in Cambodia caused widespread outrage after many of the abused women and girls also ended up contracting HIV/AIDS and other diseases that were not prevalent among the local population. A Kosovo victims support group reported that of the local prostitutes, a third were under 14, and 80% were under 18. Amnesty said the victims were routinely raped "as a means of control and coercion" and kept in terrible conditions as slaves by their "owners"; sometimes kept in darkened rooms unable to go out. In Haiti, the Sri Lankan peacekeepers wanted girls and boys as young as 12 for sex. "I did not even have breasts," said Victim No. 1, a girl. She reported to UN investigators that from ages 12 to 15 she had sex with over 40 peacekeepers, including someone called "Commandant" who paid her 75 cents. She stated that she slept in UN trucks on the UN base. In Haiti, 134 peacekeepers from Sri Lanka operated the child sex ring, luring children with candy and cash, according to the AP. After a U.N. report incriminated the peacekeepers, most were sent back to Sri Lanka, but none served any jail time.

Canadian government analysis

Internal Canadian government documents reports dated 2016 suggest that The United Nations has "glaring gaps" in its procedures for tracking and prosecuting peacekeepers accused of exploitation and sexual abuse, and that only a small fraction of cases may be reported. The Toronto Star obtained the memo which reads in part: "Events in (the Central African Republic) and the data coming out of the (Secretary General’s 2016) annual report point to a system that is lacking in efficiency, transparency and coherency." The memo goes on to say: "Part of the answer to these deficiencies lies in establishing enduring, system-wide structures but the nature of UN governance makes this a challenging endeavor. In addition, as we continue to unpack how member states themselves can better approach this issue from pre-deployment training to punishing perpetrators to victims’ assistance, there must also be a greater willingness by individual countries to examine and address internal shortfalls." In 2016, a UN report named 21 countries that had 69 credible reports of incidents in 2015. It documented 69 allegations in 2015 alone. One briefing note obtained by the Star pointed to "unique, structural factors within the UN system" complicated goals of greater transparency and enforcement. "Although military personnel are covered by military codes of conduct and justice systems, UN police and civilian staff accused of [sexual exploitation and abuse] in the field may face only minor disciplinary measures, such as repatriation and being barred from future deployments," the unclassified document reads.

1996 UN study

In the 1996 UN study The Impact of Armed Conflict on Children, former first lady of Mozambique Graça Machel documented: "In 6 out of 12 country studies on sexual exploitation of children in situations of armed conflict prepared for the present report, the arrival of peacekeeping troops has been associated with a rapid rise in child prostitution."

Eight years later, Gita Sahgal spoke out with regard to the fact that prostitution and sex abuse crops up wherever humanitarian intervention efforts are set up. She observed: "The issue with the UN is that peacekeeping operations unfortunately seem to be doing the same thing that other militaries do. Even the guardians have to be guarded." (see "Quis custodiet ipsos custodes?")

Involvement in brothels
There was one highly publicised case where members of the UN peacekeeping force were accused of direct involvement in the procurement of sex slaves for a local brothel in Bosnia. The use of agents for procurement and management of brothels has allowed the military to believe itself shielded from the issue of sexual slavery and human trafficking. Some NATO troops and private contractors of the firm DynCorp have been linked to prostitution and forced prostitution in Bosnia and Kosovo, as have some UN employees in the Democratic Republic of the Congo, where they were accused of the sexual abuse of girls.

In 2010, a film, The Whistleblower,  directed by Larysa Kondracki, aired on the affair, based on Nebraskan police officer Kathryn Bolkovac, who served as a peacekeeper in post-war Bosnia and outed the U.N. for covering up the sex scandal.  The film featured Rachel Weisz, Monica Bellucci, Vanessa Redgrave, and many others.

Actions of a few
Proponents of peacekeeping argue that the actions of a few should not incriminate the many participants in the mission, yet NATO and the UN have come under criticism for not taking the issue of forced prostitution linked to peacekeeping missions seriously enough.

Troops in Haiti, Sudan and Central African Republic

UN troops in Haiti and Sudan have been accused of sexual abuse of children. In 2004–2007, according to an internal UN report, over 100 UN soldiers were sent home for their involvement in a "sex ring", but none were charged. In 2015, the UN started disclosing more figures about thousands of allegations of forced sex with UN soldiers in exchange for material aid, of which hundreds involving minors.

In the Central African Republic, at least 98 girls said they had been sexually abused by international peacekeepers.

UN identified 41 troops from Burundi and Gabon accused of sexual abuse and exploitation in Central African Republic in 2014 and 2015. The identified troops have now left the country.

References

United Nations peacekeeping
Child sexual abuse in Haiti
Sex gangs
Sexual abuse cover-ups
History of the United Nations
Child sexual abuse